Boronal Eliasabad Union is an Union Parishad under Lohagara Upazila of Narail District in the division of Khulna, Bangladesh. It has an area of 36.99 km2 (14.28 sq mi) and a population of 8,835.

References

Unions of Kalia Upazila
Unions of Narail District
Unions of Khulna Division